The Center for Research in Computing and the Arts (CRCA) was an interdisciplinary organized research unit of UCSD in San Diego, California. CRCA provided support for numerous projects that intersect with the fields of New Media Art, Software Studies, Game studies, Art/Science collaborations, Mixed Reality, Experimental Music, Digital Audio, Immersive Art and Networked Performance over its 40 year history. CRCA was originally founded by composer Roger Reynolds as the Center for Music Experiment (CME) in 1972, and was directed for many years by F. Richard Moore. The center was renamed and the scope widened when artist and artificial intelligence pioneer Harold Cohen became Director in 1993. 

Projects emerging from CRCA have been seen at venues including SIGGRAPH, Ars Electronica, ISEA  and the Whitney Museum of Art  as well as numerous museums, galleries and scientific contexts.

CRCA, as an Organized Research Unit (ORU) at UCSD, ended on July 1, 2012. The functions, support and facilities that CRCA managed were folded into Calit2.

Institutional Collaborations

CRCA worked closely in collaboration with art and science institutions including Calit2, UCLA, UCSD Visual Arts Department, UCSD Music Department, UC DARNet, the Sanford Burnham Medical Research Institute, the San Diego Supercomputer Center and the UCSD School of Medicine.

Art and Science Research

Artists and researchers at CRCA have been involved in numerous technoscience research projects, such as Sheldon Brown's work on Game Design focusing on algorithmic generation of 3D game environments in Scalable City, the Software Studies Initiative's work developing data visualizations of large sets of cultural data and Micha Cárdenas' 365 hour Becoming Dragon project, about which Katherine sweetman of San Diego City Beat said "nobody has ever 'lived' in virtual reality continuously for so long".

Highlights

People
CRCA was home to artists, scientists and theorists. Some of the people involved include:

  Harold Cohen, Founding Director
 Sheldon Brown, Past Co-Director
 Miller Puckette, Past Co-Director
 Micha Cárdenas
 Diana Deutsch
 Mark Dresser
 Ricardo Dominguez
 Matt Hope
 Natalie Jeremijenko
 George E. Lewis
 Lev Manovich
 Elle Mehrmand
 János_Négyesy
 Noah Wardrip-Fruin

References

External links
 Center for Research in Computing and the Arts Website
 Scalable City
 Software Studies Initiative
 Version Journal
 b.a.n.g. lab
 ATLAS in Silico

Organizations based in San Diego